Abdel Rahman el-Abnudi (11 April 1938 – 21 April 2015) was a popular Egyptian poet, and later a children's books writer. He was one of a generation of poets who favored to write their work in the Egyptian dialect (in Abnudi's case, Upper Egyptian dialect) rather than Standard Arabic, the formal language of the state. This literary stance was associated with a militant political engagement: Abnudi and other Egyptian writers of this school sought to make their literary production part of the process of political development and movement towards popular democracy in Egypt.

Life 
He was born in the village Abnud in Upper Egypt. He wrote his first poetry when he was a high school student. In 1958, he traveled to Cairo. First of his works were published in the weekly magazine . In 1961, he moved to Cairo where he worked as a songwriter.
He married the former President of the Egyptian Television Network and television presenter and interviewer Nehal Kamal, and they had two children: Aya and Nour.

Works 
Many of his works have been set to music by composers including Ezz Eddin Hosni and performed by popular singers such as Abd El Halim, Nagat el Saghera, Shadia, Sabah, Majida El Roumi, Mohamed Mounir and others. 

A Taste of Fear – participated in the film script, the film was named in the Top 100 Egyptian films of the 20th century at the 35th Cairo International Film Festival critics review marking the centenary of the Egyptian cinema.
El-Mot ala el-Asfalt – named in the top 100 African books of the 20th century at the 2001 Zimbabwe International Book Fair.
Jawabat Haraji il-Gutt (2001) – written in the form of an epistolary novel the work comprises letters exchanged between the cat Haraji, a worker on the Aswan Dam and his wife at home.

Most famous poetry 
The allowed and prohibited
Death on the asphalt
Charged with forest cat
Earth and the children
The silence of the bell

Songs for many singers 
Abdel Halim Hafez: Your son is proud of you (Egyptian Arabic: "Ebnak Yoalak Ya Batal"), Every Time I Say I Repent (Et Touba), Love is Mine (El Hawa Hawaya), The Embracement of Lovers (Ahdan EL Habayeb), The Day Has Passed (Adda El Nahar), The Christ (El Maseeh) and many other songs.
Mohamed Rushdie: Under The Trees (Taht El Shagar).
Najat Al Saghira: The Eyes of The Heart (Eyon EL Alb).
Shadia: Ya Asmarany el loon  .
Sabah (singer) : Sometimes (Saat Saat).
Warda Al-Jazairia: Lovers of course (Tabaan Ahbab).
Majida El Roumi: From Beirut (Mn Bairout), I love you Egypt (Bahoaki Ya Masr).
Mohamed Mounir: Chocolate (Shokolata), All Things Reminds me (Kol EL Hagat), I am not Innocent (Msh Baryi2), Outside Windows (Barrah EL Shababeek), A Summer Moon (Amar Seify), Younis, My Heart doesn't seem like me (Alby Mayshbehnish), Oh Bird (Ya Hamam)
Cairokee: Ehna el shaab (We are the People)

See also

Ahmed Fouad Negm
Salah Jaheen

References

External links
 

Egyptian nationalists
Egyptian male poets
1938 births
2015 deaths
Egyptian children's writers
20th-century Egyptian poets
21st-century Egyptian poets
20th-century male writers
21st-century male writers